Smethcott is a civil parish in Shropshire, England.  It contains 21 listed buildings that are recorded in the National Heritage List for England.  Of these, one is listed at Grade II*, the middle of the three grades, and the others are at Grade II, the lowest grade.  The parish contains the villages of Smethcott, Betchcott, and Picklescott, and is otherwise rural.  The listed buildings consist of houses, farmhouses and farm buildings and associated structures, a public house, and a church.


Key

Buildings

References

Citations

Sources

Lists of buildings and structures in Shropshire